Zhang Ji (born 5 November 1978) is a Chinese handball player who competed in the 2008 Summer Olympics.

References

1978 births
Living people
Chinese male handball players
Olympic handball players of China
Handball players at the 2008 Summer Olympics
Sportspeople from Beijing
Handball players at the 2002 Asian Games
Asian Games competitors for China